is a 2015 Japanese apocalyptic science fiction film directed by Michihiro Takeuchi and based on the manga by Daisuke Nishijima. It was released in Japan on March 7, 2015.

Cast
 as Itsuko
 as Suko
 as Miike-sensei 
Momoko Midorikawa as Rainy
Ako Nagai as Irony

Reception
On Twitch Film, Patryk Czekaj said that "despite various technical and budgetary limitations [the film] turns out to be a truly entertaining and enjoyable experience, as well as a perfect morning viewing."

References

Further reading
Idol Neko Izuko Going on Hiatus With Music Video, Manga on Anime News Network

External links
 

2010s science fiction films
Apocalyptic films
Live-action films based on manga
Japanese science fiction films
2010s Japanese films
2010s Japanese-language films